Walcott Inlet is an estuary located in the Kimberley region of Western Australia. It flows into Collier Bay, in the Indian Ocean, via a narrow gap known as Yule Entrance. 

The inlet was named on 19 June 1865 by Trevarton Charles Sholl after Stephen Walcott, Commissioner of the Government Emigration Board, while on an exploratory expedition from the short-lived Camden Harbor settlement (in Camden Sound).  

Three large rivers flow into the eastern end of the inlet: Charnley River, Calder River and Isdell River, via Yule Entrance. The Charnley River–Artesian Range Wildlife Sanctuary and Wilinggin Indigenous Protected Area are located near the inlet.

The name of Yule Entrance is likely derived from a Presbyterian missionary called Dr. John S. Yule, who attempted to create a mission station near Walcott Inlet, which was abandoned soon afterwards by the lay missionaries sent there afterwards, Robert and Frances Wilson, owing to lack of fresh water at the site.

References 

Estuaries of Western Australia
Kimberley coastline of Western Australia
Inlets of Western Australia